Městský fotbalový stadion Miroslava Valenty is a multi-use stadium in Uherské Hradiště, Czech Republic. It is used mostly for football matches and is the home ground of 1. FC Slovácko. The stadium has an all-seated capacity of 8,121 people.

The first match to take place at the stadium was a friendly match on 12 October 2003, with Slovácko hosting German side Borussia Mönchengladbach. The hosts won 3–2.

During the 2003–04 Czech First League, Synot played their home games for the first part of the season at Brno and Drnovice. Their first home league match at the stadium was on 18 October 2003 against Olomouc.

In August 2009, it was announced that the stadium would be renamed Městský fotbalový stadion Miroslava Valenty after the 2008 death of benefactor Miroslav Valenta.

International matches 
Městský fotbalový stadion Miroslava Valenty has hosted three full internationals of the Czech national team.

References

External links 
 Photo gallery and data at Erlebnis-stadion.de

Football venues in the Czech Republic
Czech First League venues
1. FC Slovácko
Buildings and structures in the Zlín Region
Sports venues completed in 2003
2003 establishments in the Czech Republic
21st-century architecture in the Czech Republic